The Cabinet of Sigurður Ingi Jóhannsson in Iceland was formed 7 April 2016, following the resignation of Prime Minister Sigmundur Davíð Gunnlaugsson.

Cabinet

See also
Government of Iceland
Cabinet of Iceland

References

2016 establishments in Iceland
Icelandic cabinets
Cabinets established in 2016
Independence Party (Iceland)
Progressive Party (Iceland)